Wilbert Carl "Dutch, Wib" Hiller (May 11, 1915 – November 12, 2005) was a Canadian professional ice hockey player. He played nine seasons in the National Hockey League from 1938 to 1946 with the New York Rangers, Detroit Red Wings, Boston Bruins, and Montreal Canadiens The rest of his career, which lasted from 1935 to 1949, was spent in various minor leagues, including one season in the English National League. He won the Stanley Cup twice, in 1940 with the Rangers and in 1946 with the Canadiens.

He died of congestive heart failure in 2005.

Career statistics

Regular season and playoffs

Awards and achievements
1940 Stanley Cup  Championship (New York Rangers)
1946 Stanley Cup  Championship (Montreal Canadiens)
 In the 2009 book 100 Ranger Greats, Hiller was ranked 73rd all-time.

References

External links

1915 births
2005 deaths
20th-century Canadian people
21st-century Canadian people
Boston Bruins players
Canadian expatriate ice hockey players in the United States
Canadian expatriates in the United States
Canadian ice hockey left wingers
Detroit Red Wings players
Harringay Greyhounds players
Ice hockey people from Ontario
Los Angeles Monarchs players
Montreal Canadiens players
New York Rangers players
New York Rovers players
Ontario Hockey Association Senior A League (1890–1979) players
Pittsburgh Hornets players
Sportspeople from Kitchener, Ontario
Stanley Cup champions
Washington Lions players